Four-time defending champion Björn Borg successfully defended his title, defeating John McEnroe in the final, 1–6, 7–5, 6–3, 6–7(16–18), 8–6 to win the gentlemen's singles tennis title at the 1980 Wimbledon Championships. It was his fifth consecutive singles title at the Championships.  The final has often been called one of the greatest and most exciting matches of all time, and was central to the Borg–McEnroe rivalry. A dramatic depiction of the final featured as the conclusion to the 2017 movie Borg vs McEnroe.

Seeds

  Björn Borg (champion)
  John McEnroe (final)
  Jimmy Connors (semifinals)
  Vitas Gerulaitis (fourth round)
  Roscoe Tanner (quarterfinals)
  Gene Mayer (quarterfinals)
  Peter Fleming (quarterfinals)
  Víctor Pecci (third round)

  Pat DuPré (third round)
  Ivan Lendl (third round)
  Harold Solomon (withdrew before the tournament began)
  Yannick Noah (withdrew before the tournament began)
  Wojciech Fibak (quarterfinals)
  Victor Amaya (first round)
  Stan Smith (third round)
  José Luis Clerc (third round)

Harold Solomon and Yannick Noah withdrew due to injury. They were replaced in the draw by Qualifiers Kevin Curren and Wayne Hampson respectively.

Qualifying

Draw

Finals

Top half

Section 1

Section 2

Section 3

Section 4

Bottom half

Section 5

Section 6

Section 7

Section 8

References

External links

 1980 Wimbledon Championships – Men's draws and results at the International Tennis Federation

Men's Singles
Wimbledon Championship by year – Men's singles